Vellikulangara  is a small village in Thrissur district in the state of Kerala, India.

Demographics
 India census, Vellikulangara had a population of 15883 with 7821 males and 8062 females.

Vellikulangara is situated near Kodaly which is 8 km from Kodakara.
There are two ways to reach Vellikulangara: one through Chalakudy and one directly from Thrissur.

Vellikulangara is famous for the Chokana Estates and the Anapantham Forest. Cochin State Forest Tramway used to pass through Vellikulangara, which the British used to transport quality teak logs from Parambikulam forest to the port of Cochin and on to England.

Holy Angel Hospital is the major private health care facility available in the area
k

References

Villages in Thrissur district